Calosoma grandidieri is a species of ground beetle in the subfamily of Carabinae. It was described by Maindron in 1900.

References

grandidieri
Beetles described in 1900